Josip Projić (born 23 August 1987) is a Serbian professional footballer who plays as a left back for Napredak Kruševac.

Club career
A product of the Napredak Kruševac youth system, Projić played for the club in four different spells, amassing over 150 league appearances. He also spent three years with Jagodina, winning the Serbian Cup in 2013. In addition, Projić played abroad in four countries, winning the Bosnia and Herzegovina Cup with Željezničar Sarajevo in 2018.

International career
Projić represented Serbia and Montenegro at under-19 level.

Honours
Jagodina
 Serbian Cup: 2012–13
Napredak Kruševac
 Serbian First League: 2015–16
Željezničar Sarajevo
 Bosnia and Herzegovina Cup: 2017–18

Notes

External links
 
 
 

Sportspeople from Kruševac
Super League Greece players
1987 births
Living people
Serbian footballers
Serbian expatriate footballers
Association football defenders
Budapest Honvéd FC players
FC Fakel Voronezh players
FC Volga Nizhny Novgorod players
FK Jagodina players
FK Napredak Kruševac players
FK Voždovac players
FK Željezničar Sarajevo players
Levadiakos F.C. players
FK Kolubara players
Ethnikos Achna FC players
Nemzeti Bajnokság I players
Premier League of Bosnia and Herzegovina players
Serbia and Montenegro footballers
Serbian First League players
Serbian SuperLiga players
Russian First League players
Cypriot First Division players
Serbian expatriate sportspeople in Bosnia and Herzegovina
Serbian expatriate sportspeople in Greece
Serbian expatriate sportspeople in Hungary
Serbian expatriate sportspeople in Russia
Serbian expatriate sportspeople in Cyprus
Expatriate footballers in Bosnia and Herzegovina
Expatriate footballers in Greece
Expatriate footballers in Hungary
Expatriate footballers in Russia
Expatriate footballers in Cyprus